Shahzadeh Abu ol Qasem (also Romanized as Shāhzādeh Abū ol Qāsem; also known as Shāh ‘Abdol Qāsem and Shāh ‘Abdul Qāsim) is a village in Sarchehan Rural District, Sarchehan District, Bavanat County, Fars Province, Iran. At the 2006 census, its population was 46, in 10 families.

References 

Populated places in Sarchehan County